Mariano Sánchez may refer to:

Mariano Sánchez Martinez (born 1959), former Spanish professional racing cyclist
Mariano Sánchez (tennis) (born 1978), former Mexican professional tennis player
Mariano Sánchez (footballer) (born 1978), former Spanish footballer
Mariano Sánchez de Loria (1774–1842), Argentine statesman and lawyer
Mariano Ramón Sánchez (1740–1822), Spanish painter